The Cross of Lorraine is a 1943 Metro-Goldwyn-Mayer war film about French prisoners of war escaping a German prison camp and joining the French Resistance. Directed by Tay Garnett, starring Jean-Pierre Aumont and Gene Kelly, was partly based on Hans Habe's 1941 novel A Thousand Shall Fall. The title refers to the French Cross of Lorraine, which was the symbol of the Résistance and the Free French Forces chosen by Charles de Gaulle in 1942.

Plot
At the start of World War II, Frenchmen from all walks of life enlist. Defeated by the invading Germans in 1940, Marshal Philippe Pétain signs a peace agreement and the troops surrender. However, instead of being repatriated to their homes, a group of soldiers find themselves in a brutal prison camp. Most of the men resist as best they can, and some, like Paul (Jean-Pierre Aumont), are willing to spend time in solitary confinement and be subjected to beatings, while others, such as Duval (Hume Cronyn), collaborate with their jailers to get an easier life. The men find solace from Father Sebastian (Sir Cedric Hardwicke), a priest who was also in the army and who counsels them wisely. Eventually Paul helps his fellow prisoners to escape. When they liberate a village, they realise that continued fighting is the only option and join the French Resistance.

Production
The Cross of Lorraine is one of the many Hollywood World War II propaganda films showing life in occupied Europe, with the purpose of explaining to an American audience why US involvement in the European war was just as important as the war against the Japanese in the Pacific.

The film is partly based on the German refugee author Hans Habe's autobiographical Ob Tausend fallen (A Thousand Shall Fall) from 1941, about his war experiences fighting in the French Foreign Legion against his former homeland in 1940, being captured and then escaping from the German prison camp.

A number of German, Austrian, French and Dutch actors, who had fled Europe because of the war, participate in the film, not only Peter Lorre, Jean-Pierre Aumont, Richard Ryen and Frederick Giermann, but also several of those who participate in minor roles and as extras.

The Cross of Lorraine was the second Metro-Goldwyn-Mayer production about the French Resistance, the first being Reunion in France, released in 1942.

Cast

Jean-Pierre Aumont as Paul
Gene Kelly as Victor
Sir Cedric Hardwicke as Father Sebastian
Richard Whorf as François
Joseph Calleia as Rodriguez
Peter Lorre as Sergeant Berger
Hume Cronyn as Duval
William Roy as Louis

Tonio Selwart as Major Bruhl
Jack Lambert as Jacques
Wallace Ford as Pierre
Donald Curtis as Marcel
Jack Edwards, Jr. as René
Richard Ryen as Lieutenant Schmidt
Frederick Giermann as Corporal Daxer

Box office
According to MGM records the film earned $585,000 in the US and Canada and $663,000 elsewhere resulting in a loss of $179,000.

References

External links
 
 
 
 

1943 films
American black-and-white films
Films based on Austrian novels
Films directed by Tay Garnett
Films scored by Bronisław Kaper
World War II films made in wartime
World War II prisoner of war films
Films about the French Resistance
Metro-Goldwyn-Mayer films
Films with screenplays by Ring Lardner Jr.
1940s English-language films